The Vietnam Open was a professional golf tournament on the Asian Tour played in 1995 and 1997.

The inaugural tournament in 1995, played as the Gadgil Western Vietnam Open, was the first professional golf event in Vietnam.

Winners

Source:

See also
Ho Tram Open

References

Golf in Vietnam
Former Asian Tour events